The Paute River is a river of Ecuador. It is a tributary of the Santiago River, which is a tributary of the Amazon River. The Paute Dam is located on the river.

See also
List of rivers of Ecuador

References
 Rand McNally, The New International Atlas, 1993.
  GEOnet Names Server
 Water Resources Assessment of Ecuador

Rivers of Ecuador